Kuliyapitiya is the second largest town in Kurunegala District, North Western Province, Sri Lanka, governed by an Urban Council. Kuliyapitiya is home to the Wayamba University of Sri Lanka. Coconut and paddy cultivation are the main economic activities in this area. The town centre includes commerce and retail enterprises.

Infrastructure

Transport 
The Kuliyapitiya bus station provides transport to and from other locations in Sri Lanka: Colombo, Jaffna, Gampola, Anuradhapura, Nuwaragala, Katharagama, Kalpitiya, Panduwasnuwara to Colombo via Kuliyapitiya, Kuliyapitiya to Puttlam via Nikaweratiya. Other bus services go to Kurunegala, Negombo, Gampaha, Pannala, Giriulla, Chilaw, Hettipola, Madampe, Bingiriya, Nikaweratiya, Katupotha and Makandura.

There are no train stations near Kuliyapitiya.

Hospitals/Health 

Kuliyapitiya Hospital is a teaching Hospital and in Kuliyapitiya Faculty of Medicine of Wayaba University.

Education 

Wayamba University is the thirteenth national university in Sri Lanka and is located in Kuliyapitiya. It was established in January 1999. Its main purpose is to offer English degrees, diplomas and certificate courses (both internal and external) in areas such as agriculture, engineering and management.

Education is delivered free of charge to all students of national schools, according to the government policy.  These schools operate under the Provincial Council. There are also a number of privately owned schools.

Schools in the area
 Central College Kuliyapitiya
 Saranath College Kuliyapitiya
 Holy Angels Girls College
 St. Joseph Boys College
 Assedduma Subharathi Vidyalaya
 Kanadulla Dharmaraja Adarsha Vidyalaya
 Vishakha Girls College

Sports 

The two main sports grounds in Kuliyapitiya are the Shilpashalika Ground and the Urban Council Ground.

The Shilpashalika Ground was initiated by President Chandrika Kumaratunga.

Demographics 
According to the 2001 census data, the estimated population of Kuliyapitiya was 14,201.[4] The male population was 7,126 and the female population was 7,075. Most of the Kuliyapitiya residents belong to the Sinhalese majority, other ethnic minorities include the Sri Lankan Moors, Sri Lankan Tamils, Burghers and Malays.

Following Table summarizes the population of Kuliyapitiya according to different ethnicities.

Climate 

The climate in Kuliyapitiya is fairly temperate and tropical throughout the year. The only major change in the Kuliyapitiya weather occurs during the monsoons from May to August and October to January when heavy rains can be expected. In general, temperatures during late November to mid February period are lower than the rest of the year.

Heritage
The main heritage sites around Kuliyapitiya include the ancient Kabalewa (Buddhist) temple and dewala, Panduwasnuwara temple and ancient city, Angomuwa ancient Buddhist temple. The Kabalewa temple is situated at one end of Kuliyapitiya, whilst the Paduwasnuwara ancient city is near the Chilaw-Wariyapola road, close to Hettipola. The Dandagomuwa Ancient temple is near Kuliyapitiya.

References

 
Populated places in North Western Province, Sri Lanka
Populated places in Kurunegala District